Juriën Godfried Juan Gaari (born 23 December 1993) is a professional footballer who plays for RKC Waalwijk. Born in the Netherlands, he represents the Curaçao national team.

Club career
Gaari played in youth departments of amateur clubs De Musschen and Overmaas Rotterdam before joining the amateur section of Excelsior. He left the club in 2012 to play for VV Smitshoek. Between 2012 and 2014, he was a regular starter for the club and made a KNVB Cup appearance against NAC Breda, among other things. He later played for Kozakken Boys, where he quickly became a permanent starter. After four seasons and a promotion, Gaari joined professional club RKC Waalwijk. He made his debut for the first team on 17 August 2018, in a 1–0 home win over Telstar.

International career

He played for Curaçao at the 2017 and 2019 CONCACAF Gold Cup. He scored his first goal for Curaçao on June 25, 2019 in the latter tournament against Jamaica, a late equalizer that gave the team a 1-1 draw.

Career statistics
Scores and results list Curaçao's goal tally first, score column indicates score after each Gaari goal.

Honors
Curaçao
Caribbean Cup: 2017
King's Cup: 2019

References

External links
 
 

1993 births
Living people
Sportspeople from Kerkrade
Association football defenders
Curaçao footballers
Curaçao international footballers
Dutch footballers
Dutch people of Curaçao descent
2017 CONCACAF Gold Cup players
Eerste Divisie players
Eredivisie players
Kozakken Boys players
RKC Waalwijk players
2019 CONCACAF Gold Cup players
Footballers from Limburg (Netherlands)